The Sandman is the pseudonym of several fictional characters appearing in comic books published by DC Comics.  They have appeared in stories of various genres, including the pulp detective character Wesley Dodds, superheroes such as Garrett Sanford and Hector Hall, and mythic fantasy characters more commonly called by the name Dream. Named after the folklore character that is said to bring pleasant dreams to children, each has had some thematic connection to dreaming, and efforts have been made to tie them into a common continuity within the DC Universe.

Fictional character biographies

Wesley Dodds

Wesley Dodds is the first DC Comics fictional character to bear the name of the Sandman. Attired in a green business suit, fedora, and gas mask, the Sandman uses a gun emitting a sleeping gas to sedate criminals. He starts out as a "mystery man", but eventually develops into a more standard superhero, becoming a founder of the Justice Society of America. He later uses sand and a blowtorch that he could use to quickly create walls, and wears a purple and gold costume. He would later pick up a sidekick, Sandy the Golden Boy. The Sandman appeared in Adventure Comics #40 (July 1939) through #102 (Feb 1946).

Garrett Sanford

The Sandman of the 1970s was created by Joe Simon and Jack Kirby. Issue #1 was intended as a one-shot, but five more issues and an additional story followed. After the first issue, the stories were written by Michael Fleisher. The second and third issues were illustrated by Ernie Chua.  Inks were by Kirby, Mike Royer and, in the sixth issue, Wally Wood. All covers were by Kirby, and the fourth issue noted his return to the interior artwork on the cover.

This Sandman was originally intended to be the actual Sandman of popular myth, "eternal and immortal", despite his superhero-like appearance and adventures. The Sandman is assisted by two living nightmares named Brute and Glob, whom he releases from domed cells with the help of a magic whistle. They are nuisances who beg for release, who are intent on hand-to-hand combat, but are implied to be relatively harmless and well-intentioned once freed. Using security monitoring devices, the Sandman can enter the "Dream Stream" or the "Reality Stream" (in which he acts like the superhero he looks like), and he carries a pouch of dream dust with which he can cause anyone to sleep and dream. The Sandman's main task is protecting children from nightmare monsters within their dreams, especially one young boy named Jed, who lives with his grandfather, Ezra Paulsen, as well as to ensure that children have an appropriate level of nightmares rather than dealing with such anxieties in real life.

Implied to be a major foe of his is the Nightmare Wizard, who creates nightmares that are too extreme and sometimes kill children who dream them. In none of his three appearances does the Nightmare Wizard serve as an antagonist, but the two are clearly opposed to each other.

In the final Fleischer-Kirby-created adventure (intended for The Sandman #7 but published in The Best of DC #22) he even assists the legendary Santa Claus against a menacing band of Seal Men who are angry about being sent the wrong gifts during the previous Christmas.

This version of the Sandman only appeared for a handful of issues and was generally unused for years thereafter. In a retcon by Roy Thomas, appearing in Wonder Woman #300 (Feb. 1983), the Sandman is revealed to be Dr. Garrett Sanford, a UCLA psychology professor who became trapped in the Dream Dimension while saving the life of a great man (there are hints that it is a U.S. President), who was in a coma while being terrorized by a powerful nightmare monster. This issue, and the following appearance, note for the first time that his appearances outside the Dream Dimension were strictly limited to one hour, because physically entering the Dream Dimension was a one-way process, so others could send him equipment, but he could not be brought out. Despite this, Sanford nevertheless tries to romance Diana in spite of her acceptance of Steve Trevor's proposal of marriage. The issue also introduced Hippolyta Trevor (daughter of the Earth-Two counterparts of Diana and Steve Trevor), who would later be married to Sanford's successor, Hector Hall, and a major character in the Vertigo series as mother of Daniel Hall.

The Sandman also becomes an honorary member of the Justice League in Justice League of America Annual #1 (1983) (written by Paul Levitz and Len Wein), in which they fought Doctor Destiny, who had trapped Sanford in a tube like those used for Brute and Glob, and eventually the Justice League as well. Sanford declined a full membership because he cannot leave the Dream Dimension for more than an hour at a time.

The latter two appearances, and the subsequent uses of the costume, featured a red hourglass on the front of the suit that did not appear in the Kirby (or Chua) art.

Letters pages in the original series often complained of the series being too juvenile, while Wonder Woman #300 makes references to sexual dreams and has Sanford admit to observing Diana's dreams inappropriately.

Sandman, Jed, Brute, and Glob, observed by Metron, appeared in one panel of Swamp Thing #62, Rick Veitch's first writing on the series.

Hector Hall

In Infinity Inc. #50 (May 1988), it is revealed that Sanford had since gone insane due to the loneliness of the Dream Dimension and committed suicide, and that Hector Hall (formerly the Silver Scarab and son of Carter Hall) has now supplanted the deceased Sanford as the Sandman, and was, in fact, using Sanford's body after his own was taken by the Silver Scarab.

In The Sandman vol. 2 #12 (1990), it is further revealed that the Dream Dimension was, in fact, a small universe in the mind of Jed Walker which was created by Brute and Glob (who were explained as being two former servants of Dream that had escaped his realm during the Lord of Dream's long absence). It turns out that Hall has actually died some years before, and that his incarnation as the Sandman is merely a shell that Dream sucks into another part of the Dreaming when he defeats the two creatures.

Hall goes on to be reincarnated as Doctor Fate. His only appearances as The Sandman are in Infinity Inc. #49–51, The Sandman vol. 2, #11–12 and The Sandman Presents: The Thessaliad #2.

Ambush Bug briefly wore the Sanford/Hall costume in Ambush Bug Nothing Special #1, in an attempt to become sidekick to Dream.

This Sandman likeness appeared, along with Brute and Glob, in JSA #63–64. This time, the costume was worn by Sandy Hawkins. Daniel Hall recaptured Brute and Glob and again retired the Kirby Sandman design.

Dream

Dream, also known as Morpheus, is one of seven archetypal beings referred to as the Endless who embody various aspects of existence. He is the main character of the second Sandman series, written by Neil Gaiman. Dream is the personification of dreams, storytelling and—because the Endless also represent the opposite of that which they personify—reality.  Gaiman's Dream more closely resembles the concept of the Sandman as he is portrayed in mythology than a traditional superhero genre character. In the course of Gaiman's story arcs, it is retconned that the other DC Sandman characters were in various ways derived from Morpheus or his activities. For instance, Wesley Dodds' prophetic dreams warning him of crimes and disasters are explained as an attempt by reality to fill the void left by Dream's absence from his realm during most of the 20th century, while the Kirby version of the Sandman is the result of two nightmares trying to manipulate a human being into fulfilling that same role in the hopes that they would be able to control the new incarnation of Dream.

Daniel Hall

Daniel Hall, the child of Hector Hall, eventually assumes the position of Dream when Morpheus dies. He, like Morpheus, is the embodiment of dreams, storytelling and reality. He refers to himself as simply "Dream of the Endless"; in The Wake he states that he has no right to the name of "Morpheus", and that the part of him which was the mortal boy Daniel Hall no longer exists.

Sandy Hawkins

Some time later in the pages of JSA 63–64, the chairman and heir to the Sandman legacy Sand has his soul stolen by Brute and Glob to briefly assume the role of the Dream Dimension's protector, again in the Kirby-designed costume. Eventually, Dr Fate (Hector Hall) and his wife Lyta lead a contingent of the JSA to Sand's rescue. Brute and Glob are abjured to parts known only as "The Darkness". This fragment of the Dream Dimension is currently not known to be inhabited.

Subsequently, Sand officially adopted the Sandman name and a costume patterned after Wesley Dodds in the third volume of Justice Society of America.

Kieran Marshall

In the Sandman Mystery Theatre: Sleep of Reason mini-series, photojournalist Kieran Marshall briefly takes on the identity of the Sandman to battle insurgents in Afghanistan, inspired by a visit Wesley Dodds made to the region shortly before his death.

In other media

Television

Live-action
 An unrelated Sandman appeared in the Batman episodes "The Sandman Cometh" and "The Catwoman Goeth" portrayed by Michael Rennie. This version is an international criminal who uses special hypnotic sands to control sleepwalkers to do his bidding. Under the alias of Dr. Somnambular, he collaborates with Catwoman to steal the fortune of J. Pauline Spaghetti.
 A character loosely inspired by the Sandman under the pseudonym of Nightshade makes recurring appearances in The Flash, portrayed by Jason Bernard. This version is Dr. Desmond Powell, a 1950s vigilante who captured criminals using a knockout gun and tranquilizer darts. After defeating "The Ghost" in 1955 and retiring from superheroics, he became a doctor and Chief of Staff at Central City Hospital. When the Ghost reappears in 1990, Powell becomes Nightshade once again and teams up with the Flash to apprehend his old enemy. After unknowingly inspiring the Deadly Nightshade, Powell is framed for multiple counts of murder, but he eventually clears his name, captures the impostor, makes his secret identity public, and becomes a celebrity.
 The Wesley Dodds incarnation of Sandman appeared in the Smallville two-part episode "Absolute Justice", portrayed by Ken Lawson.
 The Wesley Dodds incarnation of Sandman makes a non-speaking cameo appearance in the Stargirl pilot episode, portrayed by an uncredited actor.
 Dream and Hector Hall appear in The Sandman Netflix series, portrayed by Tom Sturridge and Lloyd Everitt respectively.

Animation
 Sandy Hawkins / Sand makes non-speaking appearances in Justice League Unlimited.
 The Wesley Dodds incarnation of Sandman makes a non-speaking cameo appearance in the Batman: The Brave and the Bold episode "Crisis 22,300 Miles Above Earth!".
 The Wesley Dodds incarnation of Sandman makes a non-speaking cameo appearance in the Young Justice episode "Humanity".

Film
 An unidentified, alternate universe version of Sandman appears in Justice League: Crisis on Two Earths as a minor member of the Crime Syndicate.
 An unidentified, alternate universe version of Sandman appears in Justice League: The Flashpoint Paradox.

Miscellaneous
An unidentified Sandman appears in the DC Super Hero Girls episode "Welcome to Super Hero High" as a graduate of the titular school.

See also
Jack Kirby bibliography
Sandman (comics) lists other comic book characters with the same name

References

External links
DCU Guide: Sandman Wesley Dodds
Sandman (1974) at Don Markstein's Toonopedia. Archived from the original on February 15, 2017. 

The Sandman (comic book)
Comics characters introduced in 1939
Characters created by Jack Kirby
Characters created by Gardner Fox
Characters created by Joe Simon
DC Comics fantasy characters
Gothic comics